Chelypus ('clawfoot') is a genus of slow-moving, burrowing sunspiders confined to the deserts and arid regions of Southern Africa.

Description 

They are readily separated from other Solifugae by an absence of claws on the fourth pair of legs. Both Chelypus, and the related genus Hexisopus spend a large part of their existence underground, and their 2nd, 3rd and particularly 4th pair of legs are shortened and robust, and equipped with rake-like spines for digging.

Members of the family Hexisopodidae differ markedly in morphology from those of other Solifugae families - most patently in their fossorial rather than cursorial legs. Such extreme modifications often blur relationships with other taxa, and hexisopodid genealogy is no exception. The main external difference between Chelypus and Hexisopus is the presence of well-developed spines on the pedipalps of Chelypus. Its subterranean way of life makes the family extremely difficult to study.

Distribution 

The family Hexisopodidae Pocock 1897 is endemic mainly in South Africa and Namibia (but also in Angola, Zimbabwe, Zambia, and Botswana).

Phylogeny 

The current phylogeny of Solifugae is lacking in any subordinal or superfamilial arrangement and is largely based on the scheme put forward by Carl Friedrich Roewer in 1934, relying on highly variable characters at both genus and species level. Roewer's system has been challenged by various taxonomists and authors.

, the World Solifugae Catalog accepts the following eight species:

Chelypus barberi Purcell, 1902 — Angola, Namibia, South Africa, Zimbabwe
Chelypus eberlanzi Roewer, 1941 — Namibia
Chelypus hirsti Hewitt, 1915 — Botswana, Namibia, South Africa
Chelypus lawrencei Wharton, 1981 — Namibia
Chelypus lennoxae Hewitt, 1912 — Namibia, South Africa
Chelypus macroceras (Roewer, 1933) — Zambia
Chelypus shortridgei Hewitt, 1931 — Namibia
Chelypus wuehlischi Roewer, 1941 — Namibia

Bibliography 
Bibliography
"Catalogue of the Smaller Arachnid Orders of the World" - Mark S Harvey (Csiro Publishing, Collingwood, Victoria, Australia, 2003) 
"The Arachnid Fauna of the Kalahari Gemsbok National Park - A Revision of the Species of "Mole Solifuges" of the genus Chelypus, Purcell, 1901" - Bruno H. Lamoral ("Koedoe" 16: 83-102 (1973))

References

External links 
"Solifuges, Camel Spiders"

Arachnids of Africa
Solifugae genera
Taxa named by William Frederick Purcell